Gilfillin and Houston Building also known as Greenville Bakery and Greenville Auto Sales, is a historic commercial building located at Greenville, South Carolina. It was built in 1915, and is a two-story, brick commercial block. The building's façade is organized into two storefront sections and features a curvilinear brick gable and parapet embellished with a central, circular, limestone-keyed and brick-surrounded cartouche containing the letters "G" and "H" intertwined.

It was added to the National Register of Historic Places in 2004.

References

Commercial buildings on the National Register of Historic Places in South Carolina
Commercial buildings completed in 1915
National Register of Historic Places in Greenville, South Carolina